Le Congo, quel cinéma! is a 2005 documentary film directed by Guy Bomanyama-Zandu.

Synopsis 
Congolese cinema came to light by means of propaganda and educational films during the colonial era. Nowadays, local productions have a hard time keeping their above water, and Congolese filmmakers wonder about the future of a cinema lacking any kind of support. The film is a documentary about three Congolese technicians (Claude Mukendi, Pierre Mieko, and Paul Manvidia-Clarr) and Ferdinad Kanza, a director who made films in the years 1970-1980 and works at the National Radio Television of Congo.

References

External links 
 premiere.fr

2005 films
Creative Commons-licensed documentary films
Democratic Republic of the Congo short documentary films
2005 short documentary films
Documentary films about African cinema